Eduardo Nicolás Tuzzio (born 31 July 1974) is an Argentine footballer. He also holds an Italian passport.

Career
Tuzzio began his professional career in 1993 with San Lorenzo de Almagro. In 1995, he was loaned to Quilmes, staying there just one season before returning to San Lorenzo. In 2001, he was transferred to Olympique Marseille in France's Ligue 1, where he played for two seasons. He returned to Argentina joining River Plate in 2003. He played one season on loan for RCD Mallorca in Spain's La Liga, before returning to River in 2006.

Tuzzio transferred to Independiente following the 2008 Apertura.

Honours
San Lorenzo
Argentine Primera División (1): 2001 Clausura
River Plate
Argentine Primera División (3): 2003 Clausura, 2004 Clausura, 2008 Clausura
Independiente
Copa Sudamericana (1): 2010

International career
Tuzzio was called up to training with the Argentina national football team in preparation for the 2007 Copa América. However, he was not part of the final squad. He earned his second cap against Chile on 18 April 2007.

External links
 Argentine Primera statistics at Fútbol XXI 
 

1974 births
Living people
Footballers from Buenos Aires
Argentine footballers
Argentina international footballers
San Lorenzo de Almagro footballers
Quilmes Atlético Club footballers
Olympique de Marseille players
Club Atlético River Plate footballers
Argentine Primera División players
Ligue 1 players
La Liga players
RCD Mallorca players
Club Atlético Independiente footballers
Argentine expatriate footballers
Expatriate footballers in France
Expatriate footballers in Spain
Argentine expatriate sportspeople in France
Argentine expatriate sportspeople in Spain
Association football defenders